is a passenger railway station located in Mihama-ku, Chiba, Japan, operated by the East Japan Railway Company (JR East).

Lines
Inagekaigan Station is served by the Keiyō Line from Tokyo and is 35.3 kilometers from the western terminus of the line  at Tokyo Station.

Station layout
The elevated station consists of two side platforms serving two tracks between them, with the station building underneath. The station is staffed.

Platforms

History
The station opened on 3 March 1986. The station was absorbed into the JR East network upon the privatization of JNR on 1 April 1987.

Station numbering was introduced to the JR East platforms in 2016 with Inagekaigan being assigned station number JE15.

Passenger statistics
In fiscal 2019, the station was used by an average of 21,716 passengers daily

Surrounding area
 Inage Seaside Park
 Tokyo Dental College Chiba campus

See also
 List of railway stations in Japan

References

External links

 JR East Inagekaigan Station 

Railway stations in Japan opened in 1986
Keiyō Line
Railway stations in Chiba (city)